Biri or BIRI may refer to:

Places
Biri, Norway, a village in Gjøvik municipality in Innlandet county, Norway
Biri (municipality), a former municipality in the old Oppland county in Norway
Biri, Hungary, a village in Hungary
Biri, Northern Samar, a municipality in the Philippines
Biri, India, a village in Jaunpur, India
Block Island, an island town in Rhode Island, (abbrev. BIRI)

People
Biri (lyricist), Ornella Ferrari (1909–1983) 
Kings of the Sayfawa dynasty of the Kanem-Bornu Empire:
Bir I of Kanem (1150–1176)
Bir II of Kanem (1242–1262)
Biri (footballer), or Antonio Vargas Quijada, Spanish football player
Biri Biri, or Alhaji Momodo Nije, Gambian football player
Biria people

Other
 Biri language, an Australian Aboriginal language of Queensland
Biria people, also spelt Biri
 Biri, an enemy creature in The Legend of Zelda
 Beedi or Biri, a thin, Indian cigarette
 Brain Injury Research Institute, a center for the study of traumatic brain injuries and prevention